Jorge Flores may refer to:

Jorge Flores (basketball) (born 1954), Mexican basketball player
Jorge Flores (politician) (born 1940), Peruvian politician
Jorge Flores (soccer) (born 1977), American soccer player, played for Dallas Burn and United States national team
Jorge Villafaña (born 1989), American soccer player, formerly known as Jorge Flores
Jorge Luis Flores Sánchez, better known as Nina Flowers, Puerto Rican drag queen and reality television personality